Flatina is a genus of planthoppers in the family Flatidae. It was first described by Leopold Melichar in 1901. Species from the genus are found in Cameroon, the Democratic Republic of the Congo, Guinea, the Ivory Coast, the Republic of the Congo, and Sierra Leone.

Species
 Flatina binotata Melichar, 1901
 Flatina circellaris Melichar, 1901
 Flatina elegantula Lallemand, 1949
 Flatina fumbriata (Walker, 1858)
 Flatina flavescens Melichar, 1901
 Flatina inornata Melichar, 1901
 Flatina liciata Melichar, 1901
 Flatina rubrotincta (Haglund, 1899)

References 

Flatidae
Insects of Africa
Auchenorrhyncha genera